2,4,6-Trimethylaniline is an organic compound with formula (CH3)3C6H2NH2. It is an aromatic amine that is of commercial interest as a precursor to dyes. It is prepared by selective mononitration of mesitylene, avoiding oxidation of the methyl groups.  The resulting nitro compound is reduced to the aniline.

Coordination chemistry
Trimethylaniline is a building block to a variety of bulky ligands.  Condensation with glyoxal gives the 1,2-diimine ligands. An example is glyoxal-bis(mesitylimine), a yellow solid that is synthesized by condensation of 2,4,6-trimethylaniline and glyoxal.  The diimine is a useful precursor to popular NHC ligands including IMes. N-heterocyclic carbenes, as found in 2nd generation Grubbs' catalyst, are also prepared from this compound.

References

Anilines
Alkyl-substituted benzenes